The Secret of Eve is a lost 1917 silent film drama directed by Perry N. Vekroff and starring Olga Petrova. It was produced by Popular Plays and Players and distributed through Metro Pictures.

Cast
Olga Petrova - Eve, in the Garden of Eden/ Hagar, the Gypsy Woman/ Eve, the Quakeress/ Eve, the Wife of Brandon
Arthur Hoops - Arthur Brandon
William L. Hinckley - Robert Blair
Edward Roseman - Fothergill
Laurie Mackin - Deborah, Wife of Fothergill
Florence Moore - Rosa
George Morrell - Beppo

References

External links

1917 films
American silent feature films
Lost American films
Films directed by Perry N. Vekroff
American black-and-white films
Silent American drama films
1917 drama films
Metro Pictures films
1917 lost films
Lost drama films
1910s American films